The Poso halfbeak (Nomorhamphus celebensis) is a species of viviparous halfbeak endemic to Lake Poso and its tributaries in Sulawesi, Indonesia.

References

Poso halfbeak
Fish described in 1922
Freshwater fish of Indonesia
Taxonomy articles created by Polbot